Joel Aiyetoya Osikel (born June 17, 1998) is a Nigerian footballer who plays as a midfielder.

He also played for Nigeria under-17 team.

References 

1998 births
Living people
Nigerian footballers
Association football midfielders
Nigerian expatriate footballers
Nigerian expatriate sportspeople in Slovenia
Expatriate footballers in Slovenia
Slovenian PrvaLiga players
NK Triglav Kranj players